The Curriculum for Wales is the curriculum which will be taught at all levels of state-funded education in Wales to pupils aged three to sixteen years by 2026. From September 2022 it is statutorily required in primary and nursery education. The curriculum has been developed based on a report commissioned in 2014. Amongst other changes, it gives schools greater autonomy over what they teach children. Views on the curriculum have been varied.

History 

In 2014, the Welsh Government commissioned Graham Donaldson, a professor at the University of Glasgow who had worked on reforms to education in Scotland, to conduct a report on reforming the curriculum in Wales. The following year he recommended a variety of changes, including greater emphasis on computer skills, giving schools more control over what they taught and creating more of a sense of natural progression through school. A few months later the Welsh Education Minister promised that the report would be implemented in full within eight years. Although the curriculum was initially planned to begin being taught in 2021, it was later delayed until 2022.

The new system was planned to be introduced first for children in primary school and their first year of secondary school before being rolled out further as that age cohort progressed towards the end of their schooling, meaning that some students would still be using the old system until 2026. Due to the COVID-19 pandemic schools were allowed to delay teaching the new curriculum in the first and second years of secondary school until 2023. The legal basis for the new curriculum was established with the Curriculum and Assessment (Wales) Act 2021.

Instruction 
The curriculum applies to all learners aged from three to sixteen in maintained or funded non-maintained nursery education. The new curriculum is designed to include more emphasis on skills and experiences and areas such as "digital skills, adaptability and creativity" as well as knowledge. The curriculum groups education into six "Areas of Learning and Experience", with the intention of helping teachers draw links between subjects and teach topics in a broad way, though traditional subjects will still be taught. Within a basic framework of goals and learning areas, it give schools freedom to develop their own curriculum to suit the needs of their pupils.  Instruction is grouped into six different areas:

 Languages, Literacy and Communication
 Mathematics and Numeracy
 Science and Technology
 Health and Well-being
 Humanities
 Expressive Arts

The only specific subjects which all schools are obliged to teach are the English and Welsh languages along with:

 Literacy, numeracy and digital competence
 Religion, values and ethics
 Relationships and sexuality education

Other changes include a greater emphasis on the history of Wales and ethnic minority groups, which reports by Estyn in previous years suggested had often been poor, and the removal of parents' right to opt out their children from sex education classes.

Assessment and progression 
One of Donaldson's initial recommendations for the new curriculum was that school should be made into more of a single "journey" for a child, rather than the way he argued pupils and teachers had previously seen the process as a series of shorter chunks. This could include, for instance, more cooperation between primary and secondary schools.  The key stages into which a child's time at school were previously broken are replaced with "progression steps" with guidance of what level pupils are expected to reach at different ages. These take place at age five, eight, eleven, fourteen and sixteen years old. The standardised literary and numeracy tests which seven- to fourteen-year-old children had taken annually since 2013 were replaced in 2021 with personalised online assessments.

GCSEs 
GCSE-aged students will be enrolled on the new curriculum in 2025 and 2026.  The intention is that school-leaving exams will be reformed to reflect the new structure. Multiple qualifications in English, maths and science will be merged into one for each subject. New GCSEs will be created in subjects such as "engineering and manufacturing" and "film and digital media".

Response 
Surveys of teachers suggested that they broadly supported the changes being introduced. Journalists from the news website Wales Online spoke in 2022 to teachers and students at Crickhowell High School which had been using the new curriculum for several years. The children interviewed felt that the way the curriculum linked subjects together made their studies feel more relevant to them and improved their understanding. The staff also praised the new structure. The headteacher said that in her view,

Terry Mackie, an expert in Welsh education, criticised the draft of the curriculum published in 2019 as being overly vague, excessively focused on cultural issues and based on little research. He also noted the negative effect a similar curriculum introduced in Scotland had on results. There were also concerns that grouping subjects into faculties could lead to a "dumbing down" of instruction and suggestions that the requirement for schools to develop their own curriculum was an unhelpful distraction. Many teachers and schools believed that they were inadequately prepared to implement the new curriculum, especially after the COVID-19 pandemic.

The parents' group Public Child Protection Wales took legal action against the Welsh government over plans to make sex education compulsory at schools arguing that parents were being "denied their time-honoured right" to choose whether their children were taught the subject. Their attempt to have the introduction of the new relationships and sex (RSE) curriculum temporarily stopped until the completion of a judicial review into the subject was declined by High Court Justice Tipples on the grounds that "there is nothing in the claimants' evidence that any of the three children to whom RSE will be taught in the 2022/23 academic year will suffer any harm, yet alone any irreparable harm". The group lost the judicial review on the new curriculum, which they saw as biased, with Justice Steyn stating that "teaching should be neutral from a religious perspective, but it is not required to be value neutral".

See also 
 Education in Wales
 Education of Welsh History
 Welsh-medium education
 Education in the United Kingdom

Other UK curricula 

 National Curriculum for England – England
 Northern Ireland Curriculum – Northern Ireland
 Curriculum for excellence – Scotland

External links

 Curriculum for Wales – Welsh government page
 2015 Successful Futures Report (Summary)

References 

Education in Wales
2022 establishments in Wales
Curricula